Prince Brothers General Store, also known as the Berry Store or simply Prince Store, is a historic general store located at Prince, Fayette County, West Virginia. It was built about 1900, and is a two-story frame commercial building. It is the last surviving building of the New River coal field commercial businesses dated to the turn of the 20th century. It is owned by the National Park Service as part of the New River Gorge National Park and Preserve.

It was listed on the National Register of Historic Places in 1986.

References

Commercial buildings on the National Register of Historic Places in West Virginia
Commercial buildings completed in 1900
Buildings and structures in Fayette County, West Virginia
National Register of Historic Places in Fayette County, West Virginia
Buildings designated early commercial in the National Register of Historic Places in West Virginia
National Register of Historic Places in New River Gorge National Park and Preserve
General stores in the United States